Mynydd Perfedd is a mountain in Snowdonia, Wales, forming part of the Glyderau. The summit has a shelter cairn, offering good views of Foel-goch's north-eastern face, and the Carneddau.

Between it and Carnedd y Filiast, there are dramatic cliffs to the east, including the famous Llechen Cytrolar. To the south lies the parent peak Elidir Fawr, to the west Carnedd y Filiast and to the east Foel-goch and Y Garn. The average annual temperature of the mountain is about 6 Celsius.

References

Llanberis
Llanddeiniolen
Llandygai
Mountains and hills of Gwynedd
Mountains and hills of Snowdonia
Hewitts of Wales
Nuttalls